Madida is a South African surname. Notable people with the surname include:

Fani Madida (born 1966), South African football player 
Nandi Madida (born 1988), South African singer, actress, model, and television presenter 
Andisa Madida (born 1999), art.

Surnames of African origin